Eero Tuomaala (12 October 1926 in Perho – 2 June 1988 in Tampere) was a Finnish long-distance runner who competed in the Men's 5,000 Metres at the 1952 Summer Olympics.

References

1926 births
1988 deaths
Finnish male long-distance runners
Olympic athletes of Finland
Athletes (track and field) at the 1952 Summer Olympics
People from Perho
Sportspeople from Central Ostrobothnia